Asklepios Kliniken GmbH is a German hospitals company, one of Germany's three largest operators of private hospitals. It employs more than 45,000 people, and owns 150 hospitals worldwide.

Asklepios Kliniken was founded by German billionaire Bernard Broermann, who opened his first hospital in 1984.

Asklepios Kliniken has moved into luxury hotels with its subsidiary, Dr. Broermann Hotels & Residences GmbH, which has bought Hotel Atlantic Kempinski in Hamburg, the Falkenstein Grand Kempinski in Königstein, a luxury hotel and spa in the Taunus region near Frankfurt, and the Villa Rothschild Kempinski near Frankfurt.

References

Health care companies of Germany
Companies based in Hamburg